An art song is a Western vocal music composition, usually written for one voice with piano accompaniment, and usually in the classical art music tradition. By extension, the term "art song" is used to refer to the collective genre of such songs (e.g., the "art song repertoire").  An art song is most often a musical setting of an independent poem or text, "intended for the concert repertory" "as part of a recital or other relatively formal social occasion". While many pieces of vocal music are easily recognized as art songs, others are more difficult to categorize.  For example, a wordless vocalise written by a classical composer is sometimes considered an art song and sometimes not.

Other factors help define art songs:
Songs that are part of a staged work (such as an aria from an opera or a song from a musical) are not usually considered art songs.  However, some Baroque arias that "appear with great frequency in recital performance" are now included in the art song repertoire.
Songs with instruments besides piano (e.g., cello and piano) and/or other singers are referred to as "vocal chamber music", and are usually not considered art songs.
Songs originally written for voice and orchestra are called "orchestral songs" and are not usually considered art songs, unless their original version was for solo voice and piano.
Folk songs and traditional songs are generally not considered art songs, unless they are art music-style concert arrangements with piano accompaniment written by a specific composer  Several examples of these songs include Aaron Copland's two volumes of Old American Songs, the Folksong arrangements by Benjamin Britten, and the Siete canciones populares españolas (Seven Spanish Folksongs) by Manuel de Falla.
There is no agreement regarding sacred songs. Many song settings of biblical or sacred texts were composed for the concert stage and not for religious services; these are widely known as art songs (for example, the Vier ernste Gesänge by Johannes Brahms). Other sacred songs may or may not be considered art songs. 
A group of art songs composed to be performed in a group to form a narrative or dramatic whole is called a song cycle.

Languages and nationalities

Art songs have been composed in many languages, and are known by several names.  The German tradition of art song composition is perhaps the most prominent one; it is known as Lieder.  In France, the term mélodie distinguishes art songs from other French vocal pieces referred to as chansons. The Spanish canción and the Italian canzone refer to songs generally and not specifically to art songs.

Form 
The composer's musical language and interpretation of the text often dictate the formal design of an art song.  If all of the poem's verses are sung to the same music, the song is strophic. Arrangements of folk songs are often strophic, and "there are exceptional cases in which the musical repetition provides dramatic irony for the changing text, or where an almost hypnotic monotony is desired."  Several of the songs in Schubert's Die schöne Müllerin are good examples of this.  If the vocal melody remains the same but the accompaniment changes under it for each verse, the piece is called a "modified strophic" song. In contrast, songs in which "each section of the text receives fresh music" are called through-composed.  Most through-composed works have some repetition of musical material in them. Many art songs use some version of the ABA form (also known as "song form" or "ternary form"), with a beginning musical section, a contrasting middle section, and a return to the first section's music. In some cases, in the return to the first section's music, the composer may make minor changes.

Performance and performers
Performance of art songs in recital requires special skills for both the singer and pianist.  The degree of intimacy "seldom equaled in other kinds of music" requires that the two performers "communicate to the audience the most subtle and evanescent emotions as expressed in the poem and music".  The two performers must agree on all aspects of the performance to create a unified partnership, making art song performance one of the "most sensitive type(s) of collaboration". As well, the pianist must be able to closely match the mood and character expressed by the singer. Even though classical vocalists generally embark on successful performing careers as soloists by seeking out opera engagements, a number of today's most prominent singers have built their careers primarily by singing art songs, including Dietrich Fischer-Dieskau, Thomas Quasthoff, Ian Bostridge, Matthias Goerne, Wolfgang Holzmair, Susan Graham and Elly Ameling. Pianists, too, have specialized in playing art songs with great singers. Gerald Moore, Geoffrey Parsons, Graham Johnson, Dalton Baldwin, Hartmut Höll and Martin Katz are six such pianists who have specialized in accompanying art song performances. The piano parts in art songs can be so complex that the piano part is not really a subordinate accompaniment part; the pianist in challenging art songs is more of an equal partner with the solo singer. As such, some pianists who specialize in performing art song recitals with singers refer to themselves as "collaborative pianists", rather than as accompanists.

Composers

English

John Dowland
Thomas Campion
William Byrd
Thomas Morley
Henry Purcell
Hubert Parry
Frederick Delius
Ralph Vaughan Williams
Roger Quilter
John Ireland
Ivor Gurney
Peter Warlock
Michael Head
Madeleine Dring
Gerald Finzi
Jonathan Dove
Benjamin Britten
Michael Tippett
Ian Venables
Judith Weir
George Butterworth
Francis George Scott
Rebecca Clarke

American

Amy Beach
Theodore Chanler
Arthur Farwell
Charles Ives
Charles Griffes
Ernst Bacon
John Jacob Niles
John Woods Duke
Ned Rorem
Richard Faith 
Samuel Barber
Aaron Copland
George Walker (composer)
Lee Hoiby
William Bolcom
George Crumb
Dominick Argento
John Harbison
Philip Glass
Libby Larsen
Juliana Hall
Tom Cipullo
Lori Laitman
Daron Hagen
Richard Hundley
Emma Lou Diemer
Ben Moore (composer)
Ricky Ian Gordon
Jake Heggie

John Musto
Sarah Hutchings
Laura Schwendinger

Austrian and German

Carl Philipp Emanuel Bach
Joseph Haydn
Wolfgang Amadeus Mozart
Ludwig van Beethoven
Franz Schubert
Felix Mendelssohn
Fanny Mendelssohn
Robert Schumann
Clara Schumann
Carl Loewe
Johannes Brahms
Hugo Wolf
Gustav Mahler
Richard Strauss
Joseph Marx
Alexander von Zemlinsky
Arnold Schoenberg
Anton Webern
Alban Berg
Erich Wolfgang Korngold
Viktor Ullmann
Hanns Eisler
Kurt Weill
Paul Hindemith
Wilhelm Killmayer
Josephine Lang
Emilie Mayer

French

Hector Berlioz
Charles Gounod
Pauline Viardot
César Franck
Camille Saint-Saëns
Georges Bizet
Emmanuel Chabrier
Henri Duparc
Jules Massenet
Gabriel Fauré
Claude Debussy
Erik Satie
Maurice Ravel
Lili Boulanger
Nadia Boulanger
Albert Roussel
Reynaldo Hahn
Darius Milhaud
Francis Poulenc
Olivier Messiaen
Henri Dutilleux
Cécile Chaminade

Romanian

George Enescu 
Dinu Lipatti
Pascal Bentoiu
Irina Hasnaș

Spanish

19th century:
Francisco Asenjo Barbieri
Ramón Carnicer y Batlle
Ruperto Chapí
Antonio de la Cruz
Isabella Colbran
Manuel Fernández Caballero
Manuel García
Sebastián de Iradier
José León
Cristóbal Oudrid
Antonio Reparaz
Emilio Serrano y Ruiz
Fernando Sor
Joaquín Valverde 
Amadeo Vives
20th century:
Enrique Granados
Manuel de Falla
Joaquín Rodrigo
Joaquín Turina
David del Puerto

Latin American

In Spanish:
Juan Guerra González – El Salvador
Roberto Caamaño – Argentina
Hector Campos-Parsi – Puerto Rico
Pompeyo Camps – Argentina
Carlos Chávez – Mexico (also in German and English) 
Alberto Ginastera – Argentina
Carlos Guastavino – Argentina
Mario Lavista – Mexico
Jaime León Ferro – Colombia
Julián Orbón – Cuba
Juan Orrego-Salas – Chile
Carlos Pedrell – Uruguay
Juan Bautista Plaza – Venezuela
Manuel Ponce – Mexico
Silvestre Revueltas – Mexico
Miguel Sandoval – Guatemala
Domingo Santa Cruz – Chile
Andrés Sas – Peru
Guillermo Uribe-Holguín – Colombia
Aurelio de la Vega – Cuba
In Portuguese (all Brazilian):
Ernani Braga
Camargo Guarnieri
Osvaldo Lacerda
Jaime Ovalle
Heitor Villa-Lobos (also songs in Italian, French, English, Spanish, Nheengatu, and Latin)

Italian

Claudio Monteverdi
Barbara Strozzi
Gioachino Rossini
Gaetano Donizetti
Vincenzo Bellini
Francesca Caccini
Giuseppe Verdi
Amilcare Ponchielli
Paolo Tosti
Ottorino Respighi
Mario Castelnuovo-Tedesco
Luciano Berio
Lorenzo Ferrero

Eastern European
Franz Liszt – Hungary (nearly all his art song settings are of texts in non-Hungarian European languages, such as French and German)
Antonín Dvořák – Bohemia
Leoš Janáček – Bohemia (Czechoslovakia)
Béla Bartók – Hungary
Zoltán Kodály – Hungary
Frédéric Chopin – Poland
Stanisław Moniuszko – Poland
Eugen Suchoň – Slovakia
Mykola Lysenko - Ukraine
Mykola Leontovych - Ukraine

Nordic
Edvard Grieg – Norway (set German as well as Norse and Danish poetry)
Jean Sibelius – Finland (set both Finnish and Swedish)
Yrjö Kilpinen – Finland
Wilhelm Stenhammar – Sweden
Hugo Alfvén – Sweden
Carl Nielsen – Denmark

Russian

Mikhail Glinka
Alexander Borodin
César Cui
Nikolai Medtner
Modest Mussorgsky
Pyotr Ilyich Tchaikovsky
Nikolai Rimsky-Korsakov
Alexander Glazunov
Sergei Rachmaninoff
Sergei Prokofiev
Igor Stravinsky
Dmitri Shostakovich

Ukrainian

Vasyl Barvinsky
Stanyslav Lyudkevych
Mykola Lysenko
Nestor Nyzhankivsky
Ostap Nyzhankivsky
Denys Sichynsky
Myroslav Skoryk
Ihor Sonevytsky
Yakiv Stepovy
Kyrylo Stetsenko

Welsh
Dilys Elwyn-Edwards
Morfydd Llwyn Owen
Gareth Glyn
Mansel Thomas
Meirion Williams

Asian
Nicanor Abelardo – Philippines
Ananda Sukarlan – Indonesia
Byambasuren Sharav – Mongolia

Afrikaans
Jellmar Ponticha
Stephanus Le Roux Marais

Arabic

 Iyad Kanaan – Lebanon

See also
Kundiman
Song
Song cycle

Footnotes

References
Draayer, Suzanne (2009), Art Song Composers of Spain: An Encyclopedia, Lanham, Maryland: Scarecrow Press, 
Draayer, Suzanne (2003), A Singer's Guide to the Songs of Joaquín Rodrigo, Lanham, Maryland: Scarecrow Press, 

Further reading

Soumagnac, Myriam (1997). "La Mélodie italienne au début du XXe siècle", in Festschrift volume, Échoes de France et d'Ialie: liber amicorum Yves Gérard'' (jointly ed. by Marie-Claire Mussat, Jean Mongrédien & Jean-Michel Nectoux). Buchet-Chastel. p. 381–386.

External links
Hampsong Foundation
Joy In Singing
The LiederNet Archive - texts to over 165,000 vocal works with over 35,000 translations
Art Song Central
The Art Song Project
The African American Art Song Alliance
Art Song Composers of Spain
Welsh Art Songs .com
Canadian Art Song Project
Latin American Art Song Alliance
Ukrainian Art Song Project
Ukrainian art songs. Audio files.
Hispasong.com Spanish vocal music, in English.
Art Song Colorado
Canciones de España—Songs of Nineteenth-Century Spain 
 lottelehmannleague.org/singing-sins-archive (archived Hawaii Public Radio broadcasts about arts songs)

Song forms
Classical music styles